Dauphine is an abandoned ski jumping large hill in Saint-Nizier-du-Moucherotte, France. It hosted the ski jumping large hill portion of the 1968 Winter Olympics.

History
Hill was opened in 1966. It was constructed in by German architect Heini Klopfer. It hosted FIS Ski jumping World Cup events in 1980 and 1981. Now it's no longer in use. It was closed in 1990.

World Cup

Men

Ski jumping venues in France
Venues of the 1968 Winter Olympics
Sports venues in Isère
Sports venues completed in 1966
1966 establishments in France